Samarra Sport Club is an Iraqi football club based in Samarra. It was founded in 1973, that plays in Iraq Division One.

History

In the Iraqi Premier League
Samarra played in the Iraqi Premier League for 22 consecutive seasons, starting from the 1989–90 season, where they played for the first time, until the 2010–11 season, when they relegated to the Iraq Division One.

2020–21 Season
After qualifying for the preliminary round, Samarra in the 2020–21 Iraq Division One played 13 matches, winning 8, drawing 3, losing 2 and gaining 27 points to occupy second place behind the leaders Al-Sinaa in Group 2, and qualified for the third place match. In the match to determine the third place, Samarra played against Afak, the second team in Group 1, and defeated them 1–0 to occupy the third place, and qualified for the play-off match, which qualifies for the Iraqi Premier League. In the play-off match, Samarra managed to defeat Al-Sinaat Al-Kahrabaiya on penalties, after the original time of the match ended with a score of 1-1, to officially qualify the team to play in the Iraqi Premier League.

Players

First-team squad

Managerial history

 Zahid Qassim
 Ayoub Younis
 Ahmed Kadhim 
 Sami Bahat 
 Ali Hussien Dawood  (Caretaker)
 Ahmed Kadhim 
 Samer Saeed 
 Moayad Taha 
 Nihad Ghazi

Honours
Iraq Division One
Winners (1): 1988–89

References

External links
 Club's page on goalzz.com

Samarra
1973 establishments in Iraq
Football clubs in Saladin